Dobrinsky District is an administrative and municipal district (raion), one of the eighteen in Lipetsk Oblast, Russia. It is located in the southeast of the oblast. Its administrative center is the rural locality (a settlement) of Dobrinka. Population:  40,809 (2002 Census);  The population of Dobrinka accounts for 27.0% of the district's total population.

References

Notes

Sources

Districts of Lipetsk Oblast